HMS Sans Pareil was a Victoria-class battleship of the British Royal Navy of the Victorian era, her only sister ship being .

In deciding upon her design configuration the Board of Admiralty took what history shows was a retrograde step by requesting the reversion from barbettes to turrets for her main armament. She was completed slightly later than her sister-ship and was hence the last British battleship ever to be equipped with her main armament mounted in a single turret.

The choice of calibre, while influenced by the desire to mount as heavy guns as possible, was also influenced by the slow rate of production in the Woolwich yards of the  calibre guns mounted in most of the preceding Admiral class. , of that class, mounted the heavier calibre guns for the same reason. Following on from this decision, and given that a turret is heavier than a barbette, it was not possible to mount the two guns separately in fore and aft positions and at the same time keep the ship within the displacement stipulated by the Board. Hence both were mounted in a single turret, placed forward of the superstructure. To provide a nominal fire to stern, a  gun was mounted aft of the superstructure, behind a light armour shield.

The Elswick yards also experienced delays in producing the gun of  calibre, so in fact the times between laying down and completion of the Admirals and of Sans Pareil were closely comparable.

Sans Pareil was the last battleship to be designed by Nathaniel Barnaby.

Service history

She was commissioned at Chatham on 8 July 1891 to take part in manoeuvres, and then went into reserve. She was posted to the Mediterranean Fleet in February 1892, serving on this station until April 1895 when she paid off and was named as port guard ship at Sheerness. 

She was refitted from April 1899, and resumed duty as Sheerness guardship on 19 January 1900, serving until January 1904. On 1 October 1901 Rear-Admiral Sir Baldwin Walker hoisted his flag as second in command of the Reserve squadron.

In June 1902 she was docked in the Medway, during a trial of the New Bermuda Floating dock. She took part in the fleet review held at Spithead on 16 August 1902 for the coronation of King Edward VII, and the following month went to Chatham Dockyard for a short refit, resuming duty after a couple of weeks.

She was sold for scrap in 1907 as part of the fleet modernisation programme instigated by the First Sea Lord, Admiral Fisher.

The ship was sold for scrap, and dismantled at the dock on the River Ribble, Preston, Lancashire.  A model of the ship was removed from her at that time and is thought to be either the builder's model or constructed by the ship's crew. The 3m long model required some restoration and is now on display in 'The Story of Preston' at Preston's Harris Museum and Library.

Notes

References
 Hough, Richard. Admirals in Collision. New York: The Viking Press, 1959. Library of Congress Card Catalog Number 59-13415.
 Oscar Parkes, British Battleships 
 

 

Victoria-class battleships
Ships built in Leamouth
Victorian-era battleships of the United Kingdom
1887 ships